Laulasmaa is a village in Lääne-Harju Parish, Harju County, in northwestern Estonia.

Location and history
It borders with Lohusalu, Keila-Joa and Kloogaranna.

In January 2005 the village  had the population of 309.

The village was first mentioned when under Swedish control (Laulasmeh). People started to spend their summers in Laulasmaa from the 1930s and the first summer cottages were built in the early 20th century.

Laulasmaa is the home of composer Arvo Pärt, and is the location of the Arvo Pärt Centre.

Gallery

References

External links

 Official website of Laulasmaa SPA Hotel

Villages in Harju County